Raja Jean Fenske (born September 25, 1988) is an American actor who is best known for his role as Jake Behari in Nickelodeon's Unfabulous alongside Emma Roberts and Malese Jow. He is sometimes credited as RJ Fenske.

Biography 
Fenske was born in Rockville, Maryland. His mother is originally from Chennai, India, while on his father's side, he has German and Norwegian ancestry. Fenske attended Thousand Oaks High School in California. In September 2007, he began his freshman year at California State University, Northridge, where he studied BA - Cinema Television Arts - Emphasis Cinematography.

Career 
From 2004 to 2007 Fenske played Jake Behari on the Nickelodeon show Unfabulous, including the made for TV movie accompaniment The Best Trip Ever, in which he finally begins a relationship with the show's main star Addie Singer (Emma Roberts).

He has also appeared as a guest star on a number of popular shows such as including Lizzie McGuire, CSI: Miami and 24. His 2003 appearance on CSI: Miami earned him a nomination for the Young Artist Award for 'Best Performance in a TV Drama Series". In 2009, he produced and starred in a short, a thriller named Injustice.

In 2013, Fenske played the lead in a new comedy called Pendejo.

Filmography

References

External links

1988 births
Living people
American male film actors
American male television actors
People from Rockville, Maryland
American male actors of Indian descent
American people of German descent
American people of Norwegian descent
Indian people of German descent